Scorpion's Revenge (also known as Sasori in U.S.A.) is a 1997 Japanese women in prison film directed by Daisuke Goto, and starring Yoko Saito, Shizuka Ochi and Tetta Sugimoto. The film was a Japanese/American co-production and was mostly filmed in Los Angeles, California. The plot of the film centers on a woman framed for the murder of her husband; the plot is similar to that of Double Jeopardy, which was released two years later.

Plot
Nami Matsuhima and her husband Jiro were a Japanese couple living in the United States. Unfortunately, Nami's life changes for the worse, when Jiro is killed by an explosion from a bomb that was planted in his car.

The police believe that Nami is responsible because Jiro had signed a life insurance policy the month before, which granted Nami $1.2 million. She is sent to a women's prison and is assigned to a cell, next to another Japanese woman, Yukiko Kida. Nami learns from Yukiko and other prisoners that the warden likes to rape and torture several of the prisoners that are brought over by Zamira, the warden's favorite.

Meanwhile, Nami's friend and Jiro's former partner, Jimmy Yoshioka tells Nami about Jiro's lawyer career and had made some enemies, which leads Nami to believe she was framed. Then, Yukiko is raped by the warden and Nami decides to avenge her. Nami is brought over to the warden and kills him. She then, knocks out Zamira by slamming her head against the gate and grabs the keys. She, Yukiko and a bunch of other prisoners escape.

However, only Nami and Yukiko managed to fully escape. They are stranded and left to die in the Mexican desert and Nami learns that Yukiko is blind, and later tells Nami that her boyfriend was killed by a gang leader and was also raped and blinded by him. Jimmy eventually finds and helps them. He then tells Nami that all of Jiro's enemies have been killed, which throws them off in their search. Nami decides to help Yukiko exact her revenge. She goes to the church, where the gang leader is getting married and shoots him dead.

Nami later finds out that Jiro had faked his death and confronts Jiro at their home (which is now left for sale). Nami finds out about Jiro's motives and they fight. Jiro escapes and Nami engages in a car chase which ends with Nami and Jiro in the desert. Jiro is about to kill Nami, when a scorpion stings him, which leaves him paralyzed. Nami takes the shotgun and kills him. She leaves his body in his car and set both on fire.

Cast
 Yoko Saito as Nami Matsuhita
 Shizuka Ochi as Yukiko Kida
 Tetta Sugimoto as Jiro Sugimi
 Kirsten Norton as Zamira
 Takanori Kikuchi as Jimmy Yoshioka
 Michael Hegedus as Warden Cooper
 Kimberly Shaolm Valentino as Sandra
 Carol Hoyt as Linda
 Bebra Aza as Liz
 Kevin Crowther as Paul
 Francisco Viana as Dino
 Buddy Daniels as Fuller
 Hank Matt as Anthony
 Kim Delgado as Prosecutor

Release
The film was released direct-to-video on VHS on October 17, 1997. It was licensed in North America by Central Park Media, who released the film under their Asia Pulp Cinema label on VHS on December 28, 1999 and later on DVD with an English dub on September 9, 2003. The English dub was produced by Central Park Media and was recorded at Audioworks Producers Group in New York City.

References

External links
 

1997 drama films
1997 films
Japanese prison films
1990s prison films
Central Park Media
Women in prison films
Films set in the United States
1990s English-language films
1990s Japanese films